Cimbex connatus, also known by its common name large alder sawfly is a species from the genus Cimbex. The species was originally described by Franz Paula von Schrank in 1776.

Description 
The larvae of the Cimbex connatus, feed on species of the genus Alder

References

Taxa named by Franz von Paula Schrank
Tenthredinoidea